James William Nunnally (born July 14, 1990) is an American professional basketball player for KK Partizan Belgrade of the Serbian KLS, the Adriatic League and the EuroLeague.

High school career
Nunnally attended Weston Ranch High School in Stockton, California. As a sophomore, he averaged 10 points and 8.4 rebounds per game. As a junior, he averaged 19 points, 6.5 rebounds and 3.5 assists per game as he was named Stockton Record Player of the Year, All-State, All-CIF Sac-Joaquin Section and All-Valley Oak League.

In November 2007, Nunnally signed a National Letter of Intent to play college basketball at the University of California, Santa Barbara.

As a senior, he averaged 22.1 points, 8.3 rebounds, 3.4 assists, 1.9 steals and 1.2 blocks per game as he helped Weston Ranch to a perfect 14–0 record in the Valley Oak League. He went on to be named All-State, Valley Oak League Most Valuable Player, All-CIF Sac-Joaquin Section, first team All-Valley Oak League and Stockton Record Player of the Year. He was a McDonald's All-American nominee.

College career
In his freshman season at UC Santa Barbara, Nunnally was one of four Gauchos to play in all 31 games, starting seven midway through the season. In those 31 games, he averaged 7.9 points, 3.3 rebounds and 1.5 assists per game.

In his sophomore season, he was a second team All-Big West choice and a Big West All-Tournament team selection. In 29 games, he averaged 14.7 points, 5.6 rebounds and 1.9 assists in 29.9 minutes per game.

In his junior season, he was an Honorable Mention All-Big West choice and was selected to the All-Big West Tournament team after helping the Gauchos to their second straight title. In 32 games, he averaged 16.3 points, 5.7 rebounds and 1.8 assists in 33.0 minutes per game.

In his senior season, he was a second team All-Big West choice for the second time in his career. He was also named to the All-Big West Tournament team for the third straight year. In 31 games, he averaged 16.0 points, 5.9 rebounds and 2.8 assists in 33.7 minutes per game.

Professional career

2012–13 season
After failing to be drafted in the 2012 NBA draft, Nunnally joined the Sacramento Kings for the 2012 NBA Summer League. On August 19, 2012, he signed a one-year deal with Kavala of Greece's Basket League. In October 2012, he left Kavala, after just three games.

On November 2, 2012, he was selected in the second round of the 2012 NBA D-League draft, by the Bakersfield Jam.

2013–14 season
In July 2013, Nunnally joined the Miami Heat for the 2013 NBA Summer League. On September 28, 2013, he signed with the Phoenix Suns. However, he was later waived by the Suns on October 24, 2013.

In November 2013, he was re-acquired by the Bakersfield Jam. On January 11, 2014, he signed a 10-day contract with the Atlanta Hawks. On January 22, 2014, he signed a second 10-day contract with the Hawks. On February 1, 2014, the Hawks did not offer him a rest of season contract after his second 10-day contract expired and returned to the Bakersfield Jam. On February 13, 2014, he was named to the Prospects All-Star team for the 2014 NBA D-League All-Star Game, as a replacement for Chris Johnson.

On February 20, 2014, he was traded to the Texas Legends. On March 17, 2014, he signed a 10-day contract with the Philadelphia 76ers. On March 27, 2014, he signed a second 10-day contract with the 76ers. On April 6, 2014, the 76ers did not offer him a rest of season contract after his second 10-day contract expired.

On May 6, 2014, he signed with Cangrejeros de Santurce of Puerto Rico for the rest of the 2014 BSN season. On May 26, 2014, he was waived by Cangrejeros after just six games.

2014–15 season
In July 2014, Nunnally joined the Indiana Pacers for the Orlando Summer League and the Miami Heat for the Las Vegas Summer League. On September 17, 2014, he signed with Tuenti Móvil Estudiantes of Spain for the 2014–15 season. In November 2014, he left Estudiantes after appearing in seven games. On December 1, 2014, he signed with Maccabi Ashdod of Israel for the rest of the season.

2015–16 season
In July 2015, Nunnally re-joined the Indiana Pacers for the 2015 NBA Summer League. On August 22, 2015, he signed with Sidigas Avellino of Italy for the 2015–16 season. He led the club to a 26–14 win–loss record and averaged 18.4 points (third highest scorer in the competition), 4.2 rebounds, and 2.5 assists while shooting 90.8% from the free throw line (tops in the league) over those 40 games. He subsequently earned Italian league MVP honors.

Fenerbahçe (2016–2018)
In July 2016, Nunnally joined the Philadelphia 76ers for the Utah Summer League and the Washington Wizards for the Las Vegas Summer League. On July 28, 2016, Nunnally signed with Fenerbahçe of Turkey for the 2016–17 season.

In the 2017–18 EuroLeague season, Fenerbahçe made it to the 2018 EuroLeague Final Four, its fourth consecutive Final Four appearance. Eventually, they lost to Real Madrid, by a score of 85–80, in the EuroLeague Final. Over 29 EuroLeague games, he averaged 9.3 points, 2.1 rebounds and 1.3 assists per game, while shooting above 54% overall from the field, and 55.4% on three-point shot attempts.

2018–2019 season
On August 8, 2018, Nunnally signed a two-year deal with the Minnesota Timberwolves. On January 7, 2019, he was waived by the Timberwolves after appearing in only 13 games.

On January 16, 2019, Nunnally signed a 10-day contract with the Houston Rockets. Nunnally was waived on January 21 to make room for Kenneth Faried.

On January 27, 2019, Nunnally signed a one-and-a-half year contract with the AX Armani Exchange Olimpia Milan, of the Italian Serie A and EuroLeague. On August 12, 2019, Nunnally left the club on a mutual agreement.

Shanghai Sharks / Return to Fenerbahçe (2019–2020)
On August 12, 2019, Nunnally signed with Shanghai Sharks of the Chinese League where he averaged 22.3 points, 5.5 rebounds, 3.3 assists and 1.2 steals per game.

On January 3, 2020, Nunnally returned to Fenerbahçe Beko.

New Orleans Pelicans (2021)
On April 12, 2021, Nunnally signed a two-way contract with the New Orleans Pelicans.

Maccabi Tel Aviv (2021–2022)
On June 27, 2021, Nunnally signed a two (1+1) year contract with Maccabi Tel Aviv of the Israeli Premier League and the EuroLeague.

Career statistics

NBA

|-
| style="text-align:left;"| 
| style="text-align:left;"| Atlanta
| 4 || 0 || 13.5 || .333 || .300 || .750 || 2.0 || .5 || .3 || .3 || 4.5
|-
| style="text-align:left;"| 
| style="text-align:left;"| Philadelphia
| 9 || 0 || 12.3 || .321 || .333 || .600 || 1.2 || .7 || .6 || .1 || 2.9
|-
| style="text-align:left;"| 
| style="text-align:left;"| Minnesota
| 13 || 0 || 4.9 || .429 || .385 || 1.000 || .3 || .4 || .1 || .0 || 2.1
|-
| style="text-align:left;"| 
| style="text-align:left;"| Houston
| 2 || 0 || 19.0 || .231 || .250 || — || .5 || 1.0 || .0 || .0 || 4.5
|-
| style="text-align:left;"| 
| style="text-align:left;"| New Orleans
| 9 || 0 || 5.3 || .385 || .333 || .500 || 1.0 || .3 || .0 || .0 || 1.7
|- class="sortbottom"
| style="text-align:center;" colspan="2" | Career
| 37 || 0 || 8.5 || .344 || .323 || .733 || .9 || .5 || .2 || .1 || 2.6

EuroLeague

|-
| style="text-align:left;background:#AFE6BA;"| 2016–17†
| style="text-align:left;" rowspan=2| Fenerbahçe
| 34 || 11 || 17.9 || .440 || .451 || .870 || 2.0 || 1.7 || .4 || .2 || 5.6 || 5.1
|-
| style="text-align:left;"| 2017–18
| 29 || 18 || 20.6 || .540 || .554 || .897 || 2.1 || 1.3 || .7 || .2 || 9.3 || 8.8
|-
| style="text-align:left;"| 2018–19
| style="text-align:left;"| Olimpia
| 10 || 7 || 26.9 || .484 || .421 || .917 || 2.9 || 2.2 || .4 || .0 || 14.1 || 14.5
|- class="sortbottom"
| align="center" colspan="2"| Career
| 73 || 36 || 20.2 || .491 || .490 || .898 || 2.1 || 1.6 || .5 || .2 || 8.2 || 7.8

College 

|-
| style="text-align:left;"| 2008–09
| style="text-align:left;"| UC Santa Barbara
| 31 || 6 || 21.0 || .464 || .361 || .770 || 3.3 || 1.5 || .5 || .2 || 7.9
|-
| style="text-align:left;"| 2009–10
| style="text-align:left;"| UC Santa Barbara
| 29 || 24 || 29.9 || .455 || .455 || .743 || 5.6 || 1.9 || .7 || .1 || 14.7
|-
| style="text-align:left;"| 2010–11
| style="text-align:left;"| UC Santa Barbara
| 32 || 31 || 33.0 || .466 || .369 || .827 || 5.7 || 1.8 || .4 || .3 || 16.3
|-
| style="text-align:left;"| 2011–12
| style="text-align:left;"| UC Santa Barbara
| 31 || 31 || 33.7 || .470 || .370 || .796 || 5.9 || 2.8 || .7 || .3 || 16.0
|-

Personal life
Nunnally is the son of Deanna Johnson. Married to wife, Jen, 33 years old- the two recently celebrated their marriage with a vow renewal. They have two daughters, Jalyn Jade age 5, and Jordyn Grace age 3, and also a newborn son, James Jr.

References

External links

 James Nunnally at euroleague.net
 James Nunnally at fiba.com
 James Nunnally at legabasket.it 
 James Nunnally at nbadleague.com
 UC Santa Barbara Gauchos profile
 James Nunnally at tblstat.net

1990 births
Living people
American expatriate basketball people in Greece
American expatriate basketball people in Israel
American expatriate basketball people in Italy
American expatriate basketball people in Spain
American expatriate basketball people in Turkey
American expatriate basketball people in China
American expatriate basketball people in Serbia
American men's basketball players
Atlanta Hawks players
Bakersfield Jam players
Basketball players from Stockton, California
Cangrejeros de Santurce basketball players
CB Estudiantes players
Fenerbahçe men's basketball players
Houston Rockets players
Kavala B.C. players
Liga ACB players
Maccabi Ashdod B.C. players
Minnesota Timberwolves players
New Orleans Pelicans players
Olimpia Milano players
Philadelphia 76ers players
Shanghai Sharks players
S.S. Felice Scandone players
KK Partizan players
Small forwards
Texas Legends players
UC Santa Barbara Gauchos men's basketball players
Undrafted National Basketball Association players
United States men's national basketball team players